MLS Next Pro is a men's professional soccer league in the United States and Canada that is affiliated with Major League Soccer. It launched in 2022 with 21 teams and now comprises 27 reserve sides of MLS clubs. MLS Next Pro is classified as part of the third tier of the United States soccer league system.

History
On June 21, 2021, Major League Soccer announced the creation of a new professional league which would begin play in 2022. MLS has applied to the United States Soccer Federation for the league to be sanctioned as a Division III professional league, the same level currently occupied by USL League One and the National Independent Soccer Association and one level below the USL Championship. MLS announced that Next Pro would start with at least 20 teams, many of them owned by Major League Soccer and development teams between their first-teams and their youth academies. All MLS clubs with reserve teams in the USL Championship or USL League One initially planned to move those sides to MLS Next Pro by 2023. D.C. United's formerly owned-and-operated reserve team was sold to independent buyers.

The inaugural match of MLS Next Pro was played on March 25, 2022, at Hermann Stadium in St. Louis. St. Louis City SC 2 defeated Rochester New York FC 2–0. Wan Kuzain scored the first ever goal in the 20th minute.

On July 6, 2022, new rules for the league were introduced in the middle of its inaugural season. This included an off-field treatment rule meant to curb gamesmanship and timewasting and a new rule for red card suspensions: The suspension a player gets for getting a red card or 2 yellow cards in the same game will be served by the player when next playing against the same opponent. This is in addition to other rules that have been implemented, including all regular season draws being decided by penalty shootouts and the addition of concussion substitutions.

Competition format
The league runs from spring to fall with the first season kicking off in March. Each team plays 24 regular-season games, which will be followed by an 8-team playoff tournament. The league is divided into Eastern and Western Conferences.

Unlike Major League Soccer, MLS Next Pro does not feature a salary cap, and player contracts are held by the teams and not by the league. Team rosters can have up to 24 professional players (not including amateur academy players) with a maximum of seven international players. An MLS Next Pro club's active roster contains up to 35 players, all of whom are eligible for selection to each official match during the MLS Next Pro season.

Teams

Future teams

Former teams

Champions

Finals

See also
MLS Next
MLS Reserve League (2005–2014)

References

External links

Major League Soccer
2021 establishments in the United States
Professional soccer leagues in the United States
Soccer leagues in Canada
Sports leagues established in 2021
Summer association football leagues
Multi-national professional sports leagues
 
United States
Third level association football leagues in North America